Mutiny on the Buses is a 1972 British comedy film directed by Harry Booth and starring Reg Varney and Doris Hare. The film is the second spin-off film from the TV sitcom On the Buses and succeeded On the Buses (1971). It was followed by a third film Holiday on the Buses (1973).  The film was produced by Ronald Chesney and Ronald Wolfe for Hammer Films. Mutiny on the Buses came 17th in the 1972 box office.

Plot
Stan Butler (Reg Varney), a bus driver for the Town & District bus company, is so enamoured with a  clippie from his company called Susy (Janet Mahoney), that he agrees to marry her. While Jack (Bob Grant), his close friend and colleague, welcomes the news, his family do not share the same view, with Stan's Mum (Doris Hare) unhappy that he will want to move out of the Butlers house. Although Stan is eager to get married and to find Susy a flat for them to live in, he is forced to put things on hold when he becomes the main money earner for the Butler household, after Arthur (Michael Robbins) loses his job. While trying to find his brother-in-law employment, Jack reveals news, overheard from Blakey (Stephen Lewis), the company's Bus Inspector, that a new manager by the name of Mr. Jenkins (Kevin Brennan) has been installed into the depot, who seeks to make the buses profitable and has intentions to make reforms at the depot to ensure its staff work harder, much to the dislike of Stan and Jack who enjoy their current layabout lifestyle.

When Jenkins decides to stop the staff wearing casual, scruffy clothing under their uniform, Stan and Jack instigate a mutiny by having the male and female bus crews wear only the company's uniform that they are provided with, and nothing else. While this has little effect in stopping them having to wear smarter clothing with their uniforms, the stunt embarrasses Blakey and annoys Jenkins, who blames the Inspector for letting the staff get away with their prank. A few days later, Stan discovers that Jenkins is hiring new drivers and realises that this will provide the needed work for Arthur that can allow him to proceed with marrying Susy. In order to ensure this, Stan decides to teach Arthur how to drive a bus. However, his plans to get him properly trained soon become threatened when Jenkins has a new radio control system installed in all the buses, allowing Blakey to ensure that the buses are running on time while keeping the pair working hard. Seeking to stop management interfering with how they want to work, Jack tampers with the system so that it crosses over into other radio frequencies, effectively leading to several misunderstandings involving the police and airliners, before the police promptly order its discontinuation.

Soon after the radio system is removed, Jenkins issues Blakey with a new van, in order to help him monitor the bus routes more effectively. However, when Stan and Jack accidentally cause a fire at the depot, the staff quickly find that the fire-fighting equipment is woefully inadequate, resulting in chaos that leads to the Inspector's new van being crushed between two buses whilst they are being moved out of the building. In the aftermath of the incident, Jenkins has the fire-fighting equipment upgraded and orders the Inspector to stage a fire drill, but this only leads to mayhem when Stan and Jack flood the depot after breaking the depot's new foam machine. At the same time, Arthur, who secured a job at the company, is horrified when Olive (Anna Karen) arrives at the depot during the mayhem, and crashes the motorbike in the flooded maintenance pit, after believing that her husband had lied about the fire drill.

Despite Arthur now having a job, Stan discovers that he cannot afford a flat with the money he is earning, unless he can make more, and so is thrilled when Jenkins reveals to the bus crews that he is planning to arrange the company to run safari tours to Windsor Safari Park, whereupon the driver selected by him to drive the special bus for the tour will receive a larger wage and keep any tips they earn. However, any hope of Stan getting the job are dashed when Blakey informs him that, because both he and the depot manager agree that he is accountable for the mayhem with the fire drill, he will never be allowed to get the job. Later that evening, attending the company's dart competition in the busmen's canteen while debating on how to secure the safari job, trouble arises when he, Jack and Mum are forced to take Olive home, after she starts a fight with Arthur's clippie, Norah (Pat Ashton), for trying to flirt with her husband and getting more attention than herself. A couple of nights later, when they are in the depot after hours, Stan and Jack witness Jenkins having an affair with Norah and use the information to blackmail him into giving Stan the safari job, much to Blakey's shock.

A few days later, Stan prepares for the first run - a trial run to determine if the safari park will accept buses on its ground. While Stan is delighted with the new uniform he is provided with, and the special safari bus he will be driving, he accidentally damages the bus' rear emergency exit, resulting in the trial run being a complete disaster when it leaves him and Blakey, assigned to supervise the run, at the mercy of lions and monkeys. With their engagement on the rocks following the incident, Stan persuades Susy to come to his family's house for tea the following night to talk things over. But when it is announced that Olive is pregnant again, an annoyed Susy realises that she will never be married and storms out of the Butler household, giving back her engagement ring to Stan in the process. The next day, Stan finds out from Jack that Jenkins' wife learnt of his affair with Norah and had him transferred to another depot as a result, while also learning that his friend is no longer on his bus. Instead, he is shocked to discover that Blakey will be joining him, after being demoted to a conductor for all the trouble caused recently, but is delighted to learn that three new, attractive clippies have arrived at the depot, one of whom, Gloria (Jan Rennison), is being put on Stan's bus. The story ends with Blakey preventing passengers getting on Stan's bus, much like Jack did at the beginning, while Stan gets a feeling of Deja Vu when he finds himself agreeing to marry Gloria.

Cast

Main cast
Reg Varney as Stan Butler
Doris Hare as Mum
Michael Robbins as Arthur Rudge
Anna Karen as Olive 
Stephen Lewis as Inspector 'Blakey' Blake
Bob Grant as Jack Harper
Janet Mahoney as Susy
Kevin Brennan as Mr Jenkins

Supporting cast
Pat Ashton as Norah
Bob Todd as New Inspector
David Lodge as Safari Guard
Tex Fuller as Harry
Caroline Dowdeswell as Sandra
Damaris Hayman as Mrs Jenkins
 Jan Rennison as Gloria
 Juliet Duncan as Gladys
Michael Nightingale as Pilot
Roger Avon as Policeman (safari park)
 Barry Linehan as Policeman (patrol car)
 David Rowlands as Policeman (on beat)
 Nicolette Chaffey as Nurse
 Dervis Ward as Angry Passenger
 Wayne Westhorpe as Olive's baby
 Shirley English as Woman Getting Off Bus (uncredited)
Harry Fielder as Bus Driver (uncredited)
Alf Mangan as Darts Match Guest (uncredited)
Sally Osborne as Nurse with Wheelchair (uncredited)
Caroline Munro - Poster Girl (uncredited)

Production

Filming
Apart from the location work, the film was shot at EMI-MGM Elstree Studios in Hertfordshire, England.

The bus at the safari park in Mutiny on the Buses was NRN 607, a Metro-Cammell bodied Leyland Atlantean, new to Ribble Motor Services.

Reception
The film was one of the most popular movies of 1972 at the British box office.

References

External links

1972 films
1972 comedy films
British comedy films
Films shot at EMI-Elstree Studios
Films based on television series
Hammer Film Productions films
On the Buses
Films scored by Ron Grainer
EMI Films films
Films about buses
1970s English-language films
1970s British films